Saint Seiya: Time Odyssey is a French comics series by Jérôme Alquié and Arnaud Dollen based on Masami Kurumada's manga series Saint Seiya. Volume 1 chapters were first published in Akita Shoten's Champion Red from July 19, 2022 to September 16 before the official French release by Kana on September 30.

Plot
Chronos, the god of time, wants to become the thirteenth god of Olympus, just like Hades, Poseidon or Athena. To do this, he needs to build the "Doomsday Clock" that will change the past, present and the future.

Characters

Athena's Army
 Saori Kido (Athena)

Bronze Saints
 Pegasus Seiya (天馬星座の星矢, Pegasasu no Seiya)
 Cygnus Hyoga (白鳥星座の氷河, Kigunasu no Hyōga)
 Dragon Shiryu (龍星座の紫龍, Doragon no Shiryū)
 Andromeda Shun (アンドロメダ星座の瞬, Andoromeda no Shun)
 Phoenix Ikki (鳳凰星座の一輝, Fenikkusu no Ikki)

Silver Saints
 Fornax Jorge (ろ座のジョルジェ, Roja no Joruje) known as 'Guilty'
 Sculptor Lodi'N (彫刻のロディン, Kizamu no Rōdin)

Chronos's Army
 Chronos

Twelve Hours
 Clotho (I)
 Lachesis (V)
 Atropos (XI)

References

2022 comics debuts
Bandes dessinées
French comics
Time Odyssey